Michael Sean Brennan (born March 22, 1967) is a former professional American football tackle who played with the Cincinnati Bengals in 1990 and 1991.

References

External links
Pro-Football-Reference

1948 births
American football tackles
Cincinnati Bengals players
Living people
Notre Dame Fighting Irish football players
Players of American football from California